The 2018–19 NWHL season is the fourth season of the National Women's Hockey League. All four teams from the previous three seasons returned: the Boston Pride, Buffalo Beauts, Connecticut Whale, and the Metropolitan Riveters while the Minnesota Whitecaps entered the league as an expansion team bringing the league to five teams.

League news and notes
This is the first full season of the Buffalo Beauts being owned and controlled by Pegula Sports and Entertainment, the owners of the Buffalo Sabres NHL team, instead of the league. The Beauts took part in a doubleheader event immediately before a Sabres game on December 29, 2018, at KeyBank Center.
On May 15, 2018, the league announced its first expansion franchise; the Minnesota Whitecaps had been purchased by the league and had joined the NWHL for the 2018–19 season. The Whitecaps had played in the Western Women's Hockey League (WWHL) from 2004 to 2011 and then operated independently from any league after the WWHL ceased operations, including playing a few exhibition games against other NWHL teams during the inaugural 2015–16 season.
On August 13, 2018, the Minnesota Wild revealed its partnership with the Whitecaps. As part of a cross-promotional marketing agreement, the Whitecaps' home opener on October 6 at the TRIA Rink, the Wild's practice facility, became part of a doubleheader to take place before the Wild's home opener at the Xcel Energy Center.
August 21, 2018: The Whitecaps' new logo and colors of blue, while, silver and black were unveiled.
September 29, 2018: The Champions Cup was played between the NWHL's 2018 Isobel Cup champion Metropolitan Riveters and the Swedish Women's Hockey League (SDHL) 2018 champion Luleå HF at Hobey Baker Memorial Rink in Princeton, New Jersey. Luleå defeated the Riveters 4–2. The game had been originally scheduled to take place at Norrbotten Arena in Sweden, but scheduling challenges forced a relocation. Luleå 
January 10, 2019: The Boston Pride and the NHL's Boston Bruins announced a partnership to further promote women's hockey in Massachusetts. The partnership makes the Pride the fourth NWHL to become officially associated with an NHL team.
At the conclusion of the season, the league had set new attendance records with 16 sold out games, led by the Whitecaps selling out all ten home games including the playoffs.

One league movement
Starting in March 2018 and throughout the off-season, current and former players took to social media to promote the concept of one unified professional women's hockey league between the NWHL and the Canadian Women's Hockey League. Players utilized the hashtag #OneLeague to indicate their support. The push continued during the NWHL All-Star Game.

Head coaching and front office personnel changes

Head coaches

All-Star Game
The 2019 NWHL All-Star Game and its Weekend festivities took place on February 9–10, 2019, at Bridgestone Arena in Nashville.

The skills challenge took place on February 9 at the Ford Ice Center, the Nashville Predators' practice facility, in front of a sell-out crowd. Kendall Coyne Schofield of the Minnesota Whitecaps won the fastest skater, two weeks following her appearance as the first woman to compete in the NHL's Skills Competition as part of the 2019 National Hockey League All-Star Game also in the fastest skater competition.  Meanwhile, three Buffalo Beauts teammates won the other skills challenge events: Blake Bolden had the hardest shot, Nicole Hensley won the fastest goalie competition, and Dani Cameranesi captured the accuracy shooting title.

The All-Star Game took place on February 10 immediately following a game between the NHL's St. Louis Blues and the Nashville Predators at Bridgestone Arena. The game was a four-on-four format between teams led by Shannon Szabados and Lee Stecklein, with Team Szabados winning 3–2 following a shootout. The game set an attendance record with 6,120 at the arena.

Regular season

Standings
Final standings.

Schedule
All regular season games were scheduled to be contested on Saturdays and Sundays. There is one neutral-site game in Pittsburgh on December 2 with the Connecticut Whale as the home team against the Metropolitan Riveters at the UPMC Lemieux Sports Complex.
On December 29, 2018, the Whitecaps faced the Beauts at the KeyBank Center as part of a doubleheader involving both the NWHL and the NHL. After the NWHL game, the Buffalo Sabres hosted the Boston Bruins.

Playoffs

Awards and honors
 Maddie Elia, Buffalo Beauts, 2019 Most Valuable Player
 Hayley Scamurra, Buffalo Beauts, 2019 Players' Top Player of the Year
 Shannon Szabados, Buffalo Beauts, 2019 Goaltender of the Year
 Blake Bolden, Buffalo Beauts, 2019 Defender of the Year
 Hayley Scamurra, Buffalo Beauts, 2019 Scoring Champion
 Jillian Dempsey, Boston Pride, 2019 Denna Laing Award
 Jonna Curtis, Minnesota Whitecaps, 2019 Newcomer of the Year

Regular season weekly awards

Transactions

Retirement

Signings

References

External links
 

 
NWHL